Björn Haugan  (5 September 1942 – 8 January 2009) was a Swedish born, Norwegian operatic lyric tenor.

Background
Björn  Haugan was born in Söderhamn Municipality in the  province of Hälsingland within  Gävleborg County,  Sweden. He was the son of 
Arne Gudbrand Haugan (1917-1997) and  Anna Gunhild Widell (1920–2008). He trained under Arne Sunnegårdh at the Royal College of Music, Stockholm.

Career
Haugan debuted with The Norwegian Opera and Ballet in Oslo during 1971.

Haugan is perhaps most frequently associated with his performance in the 1983 Swedish film, Två killar och en tjej, which was directed by Lasse Hallström.  Haugan was featured as a tenor in a number of operas which have been recorded with the Danish National Symphony Orchestra, Swedish Radio Symphony Orchestra and the Royal Opera House.
Aniara – Karl-Birger Blomdahl (composer)  Swedish Radio Symphony Orchestra (1994) 
Gilgamesh – Per Nørgård (composer)  Danish National Symphony Orchestra  (1993) 
Singoalla  – Gunnar de Frumerie (composer) Orchestra of The Royal Opera (1994) 
Requiem – Otto Olsson (composer) Orchestra of The Royal Opera (1997)

References

1942 births
2009 deaths
People from Söderhamn Municipality
Royal College of Music, Stockholm alumni
Swedish operatic tenors
20th-century Norwegian male opera singers